Elmet and Rothwell is a constituency in West Yorkshire represented in the House of Commons of the UK Parliament since its creation in 2010 by Alec Shelbrooke, a Conservative. In the 2017 general election, Elmet and Rothwell recorded the largest turnout of any seat in West or South Yorkshire, with almost 60,000 electors casting a vote.

There is no town of Elmet: the name refers to an ancient Celtic kingdom in the area. The name is however referenced by local villages Barwick-in-Elmet and Scholes-in-Elmet, and also Sherburn in Elmet which is nearby but outside the constituency.

History
Following its review of parliamentary boundaries in West Yorkshire, the Boundary Commission for England created this constituency for the 2010 election which principally contains the three towns of Garforth, Rothwell and Wetherby.

Constituency profile

Situated to the east of Leeds is the seat of Elmet and Rothwell in West Yorkshire. The constituency is named after the town of Rothwell and the ancient British Celtic kingdom of Elmet. The constituency includes rural hinterland and commuter towns to the east of Leeds, including the historical market town of Wetherby, and former coal mining towns and villages, in an area slightly further south, such as Allerton Bywater, Garforth, Kippax, Methley, Oulton, Rothwell and Swillington. The pits in this area were closed on agreement that the workforce could transfer to the nearby Selby coalfield, so the area had several residents who commuted to work as miners as late as 2004.

This is mostly white, owner-occupier territory, with only one in 10 living in social housing, according to ONS 2011 Census figures for England and Wales. Considering this, below average levels of adults here claim Job Seeker's Allowance, with only 1% of constituents doing so. A quarter of the population works in retail and manufacturing; four in 10 have a professional, managerial or technical job, while one in 20 is an apprentice. 28% of constituents have a university degree or higher.

The area has below average levels of immigration. Only 4% of the constituency were born outside the UK, compared to 13% nationally.

Elmet and Rothwell ranks 206th in a list of the largest constituencies in the UK (geographical size), and 248th in a list of the largest constituencies by population size. It is the safest seat for the Conservative Party in West Yorkshire.

Academic analysis suggests that roughly 56% of electors in the constituency voted to Leave the European Union in the 2016 referendum.

Boundaries

The City of Leeds wards of Garforth and Swillington, Harewood, Kippax and Methley, Rothwell, and Wetherby.

Members of Parliament

Elections

Elections in the 2010s

The 2019 election saw Elmet and Rothwell continue to be the safest Conservative seat in West Yorkshire. A significant swing of nearly 7% to the Conservatives was recorded, in line with many seats in the area.

By numerical vote share and percentage majority, the 2017 general election saw Elmet and Rothwell become the safest Conservative seat in West Yorkshire. 

This new constituency of Elmet and Rothwell was fought for the first time at the 2010 general election.

See also
 List of parliamentary constituencies in West Yorkshire

Notes

References

Politics of Leeds
Parliamentary constituencies in Yorkshire and the Humber
Constituencies of the Parliament of the United Kingdom established in 2010